Jon Gunnes  (born 8 November 1956) is a Norwegian politician. 
He was elected representative to the Storting for the period 2017–2021 for the Liberal Party.

References

1956 births
Living people
Liberal Party (Norway) politicians
Members of the Storting
Sør-Trøndelag politicians
Place of birth missing (living people)